Francisco Solis (born 10 September 1957) is a Dominican Republic middle-distance runner. He competed in the men's 800 metres at the 1976 Summer Olympics.

References

External links
 

1957 births
Living people
Athletes (track and field) at the 1976 Summer Olympics
Athletes (track and field) at the 1979 Pan American Games
Dominican Republic male middle-distance runners
Olympic athletes of the Dominican Republic
Pan American Games competitors for the Dominican Republic
Place of birth missing (living people)